Javier "Javi" Reja Muñoz (born 20 July 1974) is a Spanish Paralympic rower and former paracanoeist. He competed in paracanoe at the 2016 Summer Paralympics and rowing at the 2020 Summer Paralympics.

Accident
In 2006, Reja was riding his motorcycle to the Seville airport, he overtook a tractor and skidded along the gravel. He bounced off and got trapped between a tree and the motorbike's engine, his leg injuries were serious and had to undergo several operations along with two months in hospital to recover.

After leaving hospital, he was medically advised to swim and he went on to win medals in the Spanish national swimming championships, as well as swimming, he tried out weightlifting, triathlon and cycling and he won several national cycling medals. Reja took a strong interest in canoeing when he went along the banks of Guadalquivir in 2011, he joined a yacht club in Seville and he won his first international medal at the 2013 Canoe Sprint European Championships in Portugal within a year of training.

References

1974 births
Living people
Sportspeople from Seville
Spanish male canoeists
Spanish male rowers
Paracanoeists of Spain
Paralympic rowers of Spain
Paracanoeists at the 2016 Summer Paralympics
Rowers at the 2020 Summer Paralympics
ICF Canoe Sprint World Championships medalists in paracanoe